Enkenbach-Alsenborn is a Verbandsgemeinde ("collective municipality") in the district of Kaiserslautern, in Rhineland-Palatinate, Germany. Its seat is located in Enkenbach-Alsenborn. It consists of the following Ortsgemeinden ("local municipalities"):

 Enkenbach-Alsenborn
 Fischbach
 Frankenstein
 Hochspeyer
 Mehlingen
 Neuhemsbach
 Sembach
 Waldleiningen

Originally established on 7 June 1969 from the combination of the villages of Enkenbach and Alsenborn, it was expanded to include the villages of Sembach, Mehlingen and Neuhemsbach on 22 April 1972. On 1 July 2014 it was expanded with the 4 municipalities of the former Verbandsgemeinde Hochspeyer.

References

Palatinate Forest